Hounslow East is a London Underground station in Hounslow in west London designed by Acanthus LW Architects.

The station is on the Heathrow branch of the Piccadilly line, between Hounslow Central and Osterley. The station is located on Kingsley Road about 400m north of Hounslow High Street. Hounslow Bus Garage (the main bus terminus) is a short walk to the south. It is in Travelcard Zone 4.

History

The route through Hounslow East station was opened by the District Railway (DR, now the District line) on 21 July 1884 as a branch to Hounslow Barracks (now Hounslow West). The branch line was constructed as single track from the DR's existing route to Hounslow Town station located at the eastern end of Hounslow High Street where the bus garage is now located. That station had opened in 1883. Initially the branch to Hounslow Barracks had no stations between there and Osterley & Spring Grove (replaced by Osterley in 1934).

Hounslow Town station was closed on 31 March 1886 and Heston & Hounslow station (now Hounslow Central), opened as its replacement the following day, 1 April 1886.

In 1903 Hounslow Town station was reopened and trains would be divided at Osterley & Spring Grove station, with part running to Hounslow West and the other part to Hounslow Town as a short shuttle. Electrification of the DR's tracks took place between 1903 and 1905 with electric trains replacing steam trains on the Hounslow branch from 13 June 1905. When the branch was electrified, the track between Osterley & Spring Grove station and Hounslow Central was closed and a new loop was opened from Hounslow Town back to Hounslow Central. Trains would run from Osterley to Hounslow Town then reverse and run over the new loop to reach the main line and so continue to Hounslow West.

This method of operation was unsuccessful and short-lived. The old Hounslow Town station and its two loop tracks were closed for good. Part of the embankment that carried the original single track to Hounslow Town Station (now Hounslow Bus garage) is still visible, just east of Hounslow East station.

On 1 December 1925 the station was given its present name at the same time that Hounslow West and Hounslow Central received their current names.

Piccadilly Line services, which had been running as far as Northfields since January 1933 were extended to run to Hounslow West on 13 March 1933. From this date, the branch was operated jointly by both lines until District Line services were withdrawn on 9 October 1964.

New station buildings, to designs by Acanthus Lawrence and Wrightson Architects, have now replaced the old ones . Phase 1 of the scheme, which was completed in July 2002, required the excavation of the existing embankment and provided a new ticket hall with ancillary staff accommodation, interchange passageway and stairs to each platform. The second phase which involved the construction of the eastbound platform building, with a striking green roof, completed early 2003. As part of the works lifts have been provided to both platforms.

Staff frequently play classical music on the PA system as part of an experiment to discourage anti-social activities at the station.

Connections
London Buses routes 111 and H28 serve the station. Hounslow Bus Station is a two-minute walk away.

References

External links

 
 
 
 
 
 
 

Piccadilly line stations
London Underground Night Tube stations
East
Former Metropolitan District Railway stations
Railway stations in Great Britain opened in 1909